The Sumter County Library System (SCLS) consists of five locations throughout Sumter County.

Locations
The Sumter County Library District (SCLS) consists of five library locations throughout the Sumter County area.

SCLS also operates the Library on Wheels with multiple stops in the community.

LReferences

External links
Sumter County Library website
Sumter County Library website

Sumter
Libraries in Florida
Sumter County, Florida